Babylon's Ashes is a science fiction novel by James S. A. Corey, the pen name of Daniel Abraham and Ty Franck, and the sixth book in their The Expanse series. The title of the novel was announced in early July 2015 and the cover and brief synopsis were revealed on September 14, 2015. It won the 2017 Dragon Award for Best Science Fiction Novel.

Plot summary
Following the events of Nemesis Games, the so-called Free Navy, made up of Belters using stolen military ships, has been growing ever bolder. After the crippling attacks on Earth and the Martian Navy, the Free Navy turns its attention to the colony ships headed for the ring gates and the worlds beyond. The relatively defenseless ships are left to fend for themselves, as neither Earth nor Mars is powerful enough to protect them. James Holden and the crew of the Rocinante are called upon once again by what remains of the UN and Martian governments to go to Medina Station, now in the hands of the Free Navy, in the ring station. On the other side of the rings, an alien threat is growing: the Free Navy may be the least of humanity's problems.

Characters

 James Holden, Captain of the Rocinante and increasingly competent and trusted negotiator and troubleshooter of the solar system, is back in the thick of things as a combined fleet of ships from Earth, Mars, and the Outer Planets Alliance fight the Free Navy and try to structure a new place for humanity in the universe. When the war is over, he is the one to suggest creating an organization made up of Belters that would control space commerce so they will still have a functioning economy.
 Naomi Nagata, one of the best engineers in the solar system and XO of the Rocinante, is in the difficult situation of fighting an opposing side she knows includes her son. She is the one to discover that the force in the ring gates is only consuming ships when the energy going through the gates reaches a certain threshold, then she comes up with a plan to send a large number of ships through the gate right before the Free Navy arrives for battle. The plan is a success and the Free Navy is destroyed.
 Alex Kamal, pilot of the Rocinante, lives for being strapped into a maneuverable ship and solving problems on the fly, preferably not getting killed while he's doing so. As war drags on, it's possible he may find something else to live for.
 Amos Burton, mechanic on the Rocinante, survived the battering of Earth with a friend, Clarissa. Now a teacher, he tries to get his own fighting in when he can.
 Bobbie Draper, former Martian Marine and now military advisor to Earth's leader and crew member of the Rocinante, understands that battle is necessary at times and will do her part as best she can. After a frustrating battle she cannot participate in, a split-second decision changes the dynamics of defense for Medina Station.
 Clarissa Mao, former prisoner on Earth and now a mechanic's apprentice on the Rocinante, is trying to fit into her new life with the people she once tried to destroy.
 Filip Inaros, son of the Free Navy's leader and Naomi Nagata, is growing disillusioned with life as a revolutionary. Finding it increasingly difficult to match his father's statements and actions, he eventually leaves and begins a new life under a new name on Callisto.
 Michio Pa, member of the original inner circle of the Free Navy, faced a choice. She joined the Free Navy because of Marco's promises to build a better, more prosperous society on the outer planets with resources stolen from colony ships. As the war continues, she tries to pressure Marco Inaros to negotiate a ceasefire so the rebuilding can begin. She repeatedly points out that there is a limited time frame in which the Belt and outer planets can create a self-sustaining economy to no avail. In the end, she and other members of the Free Navy desert.
 Anderson Dawes, Governor of Ceres Station and long-time OPA leader, is having trouble finding a new role within the Free Navy. When the order comes to abandon Ceres, he begrudgingly follows it, but makes another choice to rally the various OPA factions around James Holden and the anti-Inaros forces as well.
 Chrisjen Avasarala, now the leader of a battered Earth, is trying to fight multiple battles at once: slowing the death rate of Earth's decreasing population, trying to stop Mars from supporting the Free Navy, and trying to keep the Free Navy from causing further damage.
 Praxidike Meng, plant researcher at Ganymede, is trying to wend his way through the changing political winds on the station that has declared itself officially neutral. Always trying to solve problems with food production, he may have an answer for the long-term survival of the human species.
 Jakulski, Roberts, Salis, and Vandercaust, workers on Medina Station in the "Slow Zone" between star gates they all know that their station will be key to any war. Their positions shift radically as paranoia becomes the policy of the day.
 Fred Johnson, long-time recognized leader of the Outer Planets Alliance trying to find his new position within the hierarchy created by the rise of the Free Navy. During a battle with the Free Navy he suffers a fatal stroke.
 Marco Inaros, leader of the Free Navy and father to Filip, has succeeded in knocking the old regime back on its heels. When the allied forces advance against him, he is forced to contend with the fact that, while the Free Navy has advanced military hardware, he and the other leaders do not have the tactical knowledge needed to properly fight navies led by professional officers. He attempts to make up for this shortcoming by pulling out of the Belt without fighting, forcing his enemies to expend their resources in a costly occupation, explicitly comparing the Free Navy to the Taliban. This does not work and the Free Navy is eventually destroyed by a combination of mutinies, desertion, battles with the inners, and its ships being consumed by the force in the gates.

Short story 
"Strange Dogs" is a short story published by James S. A Corey set between Babylon's Ashes and its sequel Persepolis Rising. It consists of 103 pages.

References

External links
 

2016 American novels
2016 science fiction novels
American science fiction novels
Fiction set on Ganymede (moon)
Novels by James S. A. Corey
Space opera novels
The Expanse
Orbit Books books